The 2009 Copa Petrobras São Paulo was a professional tennis tournament played on outdoor red clay courts. It was the sixth edition of the tournament which was part of the 2009 ATP Challenger Tour. It took place in São Paulo, Brazil between 26 October and 1 November 2009.

ATP entrants

Seeds

 Rankings are as of October 19, 2009.

Other entrants
The following players received wildcards into the singles main draw:
  Thiago Alves
  Marcelo Demoliner
  Nicolás Lapentti
  Gabriel Wanderley

The following player received a Special Exempt into the singles main draw:
  Gastón Gaudio

The following players received entry from the qualifying draw:
  Rogério Dutra da Silva
  Guillermo Hormazábal
  Axel Michon
  Caio Zampieri

Champions

Singles

 Thomaz Bellucci def.  Nicolás Lapentti, 6–4, 6–4

Doubles

 Franco Ferreiro /  Ricardo Mello def.  Diego Junqueira /  David Marrero, 6–3, 6–3

External links
Official website
ITF Search 
2009 Draws

2009 ATP Challenger Tour
Clay court tennis tournaments
Tennis tournaments in Brazil
Copa Petrobras São Paulo